The swollen-nosed side-blotched lizard (Uta tumidarostra) is a species of lizard. Its range is in Mexico.

References 

Uta
Reptiles of Mexico
Reptiles described in 1994
Taxa named by Larry Lee Grismer